Harry Clarke (1889–1931) was an Irish stained-glass designer and book illustrator.

Harry Clarke may also refer to:
Harry Clarke (American football) (1917–2005), American football player 
Harry Clarke (Australian footballer, born 1876) (1876–1946), Australian rules footballer who played with Fitzroy
Harry Clarke (Australian footballer, born 1885) (1885–1961), Australian rules footballer who played with St Kilda
Harry Clarke (Australian footballer, born 1905) (1905–1989), Australian rules footballer who played with South Melbourne
Harry Clarke (footballer, born 1875), English footballer
Harry Clarke (footballer, born 1921) (1921–2015), English football forward for Darlington, Leeds and Hartlepool
Harry Clarke (footballer, born 1923) (1923–2000), English footballer for Tottenham Hotspur and England
Harry Clarke (footballer, born 2001), English footballer for Arsenal and Oldham Athletic
Harry Corson Clarke  (1861–1923), American actor
Harry Gladstone Clarke (1881–1956), Canadian Member of Parliament (1935–1940)
Harold Clarke (1888–1969), British diver
Harry Clarke, perpetrator of the 2014 Glasgow bin lorry crash
Harry Clarke, a 2017 play by David Cale

See also
Harry Clark (disambiguation)
Harold Clarke (disambiguation)
Henry Clarke (disambiguation)